Boxhorn is a village in the commune of Wincrange, canton of Clervaux, district of Diekirch in northern Luxembourg.  , the village had a population of 398.

Boxhorn is located in the region of Diekirch. Diekirch's capital Diekirch (Diekirch) is approximately 27 km / 17 mi away from Boxhorn (as the crow flies).

References

Villages in Luxembourg
Wincrange